Omanjska is a village in the municipalities of Doboj (Republika Srpska) and Usora, Bosnia and Herzegovina.

Demographics 
According to the 2013 census, its population was 959, with only 6 living in the Doboj part, and 953 living in the Usora part

References

Villages in Republika Srpska
Populated places in Doboj
Populated places in Usora